Marash Nikolin Kumbulla (born 8 February 2000) is a professional footballer who plays as a defender for Italian Serie A club Roma. Born in Italy, he represents the Albania national team.

Club career

Kumbulla made his professional debut for Hellas Verona on 12 August 2018, starting in a 2–0 away loss to Catania in the Coppa Italia.

On 17 September 2020, Kumbulla joined Roma on loan with an obligation to buy.

International career
Kumbulla made his senior debut for the Albania national football team on 14 October 2019, in a 4–0 away win against Moldova in a Euro 2020 qualifier. He came on for Ardian Ismajli in the 89th minute.

Personal life
On 10 November 2020, Kumbulla tested positive for COVID-19.

Career statistics

Club

International

Honours 
Roma
 UEFA Europa Conference League: 2021–22

References

External links
Profile at the A.S. Roma website

2000 births
Living people
Sportspeople from the Province of Verona
Albanian footballers
Albania youth international footballers
Albania under-21 international footballers
Albania international footballers
Italian footballers
Italian people of Albanian descent
Association football defenders
Serie A players
Serie B players
Hellas Verona F.C. players
A.S. Roma players
Footballers from Veneto

UEFA Europa Conference League winning players